Ranibizumab, sold under the brand name Lucentis among others, is a monoclonal antibody fragment (Fab) created from the same parent mouse antibody as bevacizumab. It is an anti-angiogenic that is approved to treat the "wet" type of age-related macular degeneration (AMD, also ARMD), diabetic retinopathy, and macular edema due to branch retinal vein occlusion or central retinal vein occlusion.

Ranibizumab was developed by Genentech and marketed by them in the United States, and elsewhere by Novartis, under the brand name Lucentis. Ranibizumab (Lucentis) was approved for medical use in the United States in June 2006, and in the European Union in January 2007.

Medical uses
In the United States, ranibizumab is indicated for the treatment of neovascular (wet) age-related macular degeneration, macular edema following retinal vein occlusion, diabetic macular edema, diabetic retinopathy, and myopic choroidal neovascularization.

In the European Union, ranibizumab is indicated for the treatment of neovascular (wet) age-related macular degeneration, visual impairment due to diabetic macular edema, proliferative diabetic retinopathy, visual impairment due to macular edema secondary to retinal vein occlusion, and visual impairment due to choroidal neovascularisation.

It is often used for age-related wet macular degeneration. Its effectiveness is similar to that of bevacizumab and aflibercept. A 2017 systematic review update found that while ranibizumab and bevacizumab provide similar functional outcomes in diabetic macular edema, there is low-certainty evidence suggesting that ranibizumab is more effective in reducing central retinal thickness than bevacizumab.

Side effects 
A 2014 Cochrane review did not find a difference between bevacizumab and ranibizumab in deaths or total severe side effects when used for macular degeneration. There, however, was not a lot of evidence, and thus this conclusion is not that certain.

Ranibizumab does appear to result in a lower risk of stomach and intestinal problems. It is also associated with a low rate of eye related side effects.

The most common side effects in clinical trials were conjunctival haemorrhage, eye pain, vitreous floaters, increased intraocular pressure, and intraocular inflammation.

Although there is a theoretical risk for arterial thromboembolic events in people receiving VEGF-inhibitors by intravitreal injection, the observed incidence rate was low (< 4%) and similar to that seen with placebo.

Serious adverse events related to the injection procedure occurred with an incidence rate of less than 1% and included endophthalmitis, retinal detachment, and traumatic cataracts. Other serious ocular adverse events observed among ranibizumab-treated patients (incidence rate < 1%) included intraocular inflammation and blindness.

Interactions 
No significant interactions are known.

Pharmacology
Ranibizumab is a monoclonal antibody that inhibits angiogenesis by inhibiting vascular endothelial growth factor A, a mechanism similar to that of Bevacizumab.

Society and culture

Economics 
Its effectiveness is similar to that of bevacizumab. Its rates of side effects also appear similar. However, ranibizumab typically costs $2,000 a dose, while the equivalent dose of bevacizumab typically costs $50.

In November 2010, The New York Times reported that Genentech began offering secret rebates to about 300 ophthalmologists in an apparent inducement to get them to use more ranibizumab rather than their less expensive bevacizumab.  This may have been in anticipation of the results of the CATT clinical trial, which was sponsored by the National Eye Institute, and compared the relative safety and efficacy of ranibizumab and bevacizumab in treating AMD. In 2008, bevacizumab cost Medicare only $20 million for about 480,000 injections, while ranibizumab cost Medicare $537 million for only 337,000 injections. A small study showed no superior effect of ranibizumab versus bevacizumab in direct comparison.
The initial results of the larger Comparison of Age-related Macular Degeneration Treatments Trials (CATT) trial were published in the New England Journal of Medicine in May 2011.  The trial showed that the two drugs "had equivalent effects on visual acuity when administered according to the same schedule;" however, serious adverse events were more common in the bevacizumab arm of the trial.

The results of several subsequent head-to-head trials of the two anti-VEGF treatments were later published, and the overall results reinforced CATT's findings. The two therapies performed equally at restoring visual acuity according to a 2012 meta-analysis, and also in the IVAN trial, alone and in the investigators' meta-analysis pooling its own results with CATT's.  A 2012 meta-analysis focused specifically on safety issues concluded that the rates of several adverse events were higher with bevacizumab, although the absolute rates of ocular serious adverse events were low with both therapies: ocular adverse events were about 2.8 times as frequent with bevacizumab than with ranibizumab, and "The proportion of patients with serious infections and gastrointestinal disorders was also higher."  The authors concluded that "clinicians and patients should continue to carefully weigh-up the benefits and harms when choosing between the two treatment options. We also emphasize the need for studies that are powered not just for efficacy, but for defined safety outcomes based on the signals detected in this systematic review".

Biosimilars 

Byooviz was approved for medical use in the European Union in August 2021.

Ranibizumab-nuna (Byooviz) was approved for medical use in the United States in September 2021.

Susvimo was approved for medical use in the United States in October 2021.

In India, Lupin Limited received marketing approval for its biosimilar of Ranibizumab.

On 23 June 2022, the Committee for Medicinal Products for Human Use (CHMP) of the European Medicines Agency (EMA) adopted a positive opinion, recommending the granting of a marketing authorization for the medicinal product Ranivisio, intended for the treatment of neovascular (wet) age-related macular degeneration, visual impairment due to macular edema or choroidal neovascularization, and proliferative diabetic retinopathy. The applicant for this medicinal product is Midas Pharma GmbH. Ranivisio was approved for medical use in the European Union in August 2022.

Ranibizumab-eqrn (Cimerli) was approved for medical use in the United States in August 2022.

On 15 September 2022, the Committee for Medicinal Products for Human Use (CHMP) of the European Medicines Agency (EMA) adopted a positive opinion, recommending the granting of a marketing authorization for the medicinal product Ximluci, intended for the treatment of neovascular (wet) age-related macular degeneration, visual impairment due to diabetic macular edema, proliferative diabetic retinopathy, visual impairment due to macular edema secondary to retinal vein occlusion (branch RVO or central RVO), and visual impairment due to choroidal neovascularization. The applicant for this medicinal product is STADA Arzneimittel AG. Ximluci was approved for medical use in the European Union in November 2022.

References

External links 
 

Breakthrough therapy
Genentech brands
Hoffmann-La Roche brands
Monoclonal antibodies
Novartis brands
Ophthalmology drugs
Orphan drugs